Dialium bipindense is a species of flowering plant in the family Fabaceae. It is native to Cameroon and Gabon. It is threatened by habitat loss.

References

bipindense
Flora of Cameroon
Flora of Gabon
Near threatened flora of Africa
Taxonomy articles created by Polbot